Josephus (Titus Flavius Josephus; 37 – c. 100) was a Roman Jewish historian.

Josephus may also refer to:

From antiquity

From the Middle Ages, and: Renaissance (Latinized names) 

 Josephus Abudacnus/Josephus Barbatus (Yusuf ibn Abu Dhaqn; born 1570s), Egyptian Coptic writer
 Josephus Adjutus (c. 1602–1668), Assyrian theologian
 Josephus Blancanus (Giuseppe Biancani; 1566–1624), Italian Jesuit astronomer, mathematician, and selenographer
 Josephus Catalanus (Giuseppe Catalani; 1698–1764), Italian church historian
 Josephus Exoniensis/Josephus Iscanus (Joseph of Exeter; fl. 1180–1190), English poet in Latin
 Josephus a Matre Dei (José de Calasanz; 1557–1648), Spanish Catholic priest, educator and the founder of the Pious Schools
 Josephus Quercetanus (Joseph Duchesne; c.1544–1609), French physician
 Josephus Scottus (died between 791 and 804), Irish scholar, diplomat, poet and ecclesiastic
 Josephus Struthius (1510–c. 1569), Polish physician

Among modern era given names 

 Josephus Albertus "Joseph" Alberdingk Thijm (1820–1889), Dutch art critic, philologist, and poet
 Josephus Pius Barbour (1894-1974), American Baptist pastor
 Josephus "Joop" Beek (1917–1983), Dutch and later Indonesian Jesuit, priest, educator and politician
 Josephus S. Cecil (1878–1940), United States Army officer in the Philippine–American War
 Josephus Chaffin (c.1826–1873), American entertainer billed as the American Tom Thumb and the Virginia Dwarf
 Josephus Flavius Cook (1838–1901), American philosophical lecturer
 Josephus Daniels (1862–1948), American newspaper editor
 Josephus Laurentius Dyckmans (1811–1888), Belgian genre and portrait painter
 Josephus Andreas Fodor (1751–1828), Dutch violinist and composer
 Josephus E.A.M. "Jos" Geysels (born 1952), Belgian politician
 Josephus M.M. "Jos" Hermens (born 1950), Dutch long-distance runner and running coach
 Josephus Flavius Holloway (1825–1896), American mechanical engineer
 Josephus Antonius "Jos" van Kemenade (1937–2020), Dutch sociologist and government minister
 Josephus Augustus Knip (1777–1847), Dutch painter
 Josephus "Sepp" Koster (born 1974), Dutch racing driver
 Josephus J.M. "Jos" van der Lans (born 1954), Dutch cultural psychologist, journalist and politician
 Josephus Nelson Larned (1836–1913), American newspaper editor, author, librarian and historian
 Josephus C.F. "Jef" Last (1898–1972), Dutch poet, writer, translator and cosmopolitan
 Josephus Nicolaus Laurenti (1735–1805), Austrian naturalist
 Josephus Lyles (born 1998), American sprinter
 Josephus L. Mavretic (born 1934), American Marine Corps officer and politician
 Josephus Gerhardus "Jozef" Rulof (1898–1952), Dutch author who was known as a psychic and spirit medium
 Josephus R.H. "Josef" van Schaik (1882–1962), Dutch politician 
 Josephus Schenk (born 1980), Dutch darts player
 Josephus Serré (1907–1991), Dutch modern pentathlete
 Josephus Tethool (1934–2010), Indonesian Roman Catholic bishop
 Josephus Thimister (1962–2019),  Belgian interior decorator and fashion designer 
 Josephus Albertus "Jos" Vandeloo (1925–2015), Belgian writer and poet
 Josephus Maria "Jef" Vander Veken (1872–1964), Belgian art restorer, copyist and art forger
 Josephus C. Vines (1873–1964), American politician
 Josephus Yenay (born 1975), Liberian footballer

Among fictional characters 
 
 Josephus of Arimathea, a character in some versions of the Arthurian legend

See also 

Dutch masculine given names
Latin masculine given names